The March F. Riddle Center is a multi-purpose arena on the campus of Methodist University in Fayetteville, North Carolina.  The arena was built in 1990. With a capacity of 1,300 people, it is home to the Methodist Monarchs college basketball and volleyball teams in the NCAA Division III USA South Athletic Conference. It was also home to the Carolina Cougarz of the Continental Basketball League for their only year in the league.

References

External links
Riddle Center page on Methodist Monarchs athletics website

Indoor arenas in North Carolina
Basketball venues in North Carolina
Buildings and structures in Fayetteville, North Carolina
American Basketball Association (2000–present) venues
Sports venues in Cumberland County, North Carolina
College volleyball venues in the United States
1990 establishments in North Carolina
Sports venues completed in 1990
College basketball venues in the United States
Methodist Monarchs